Midnight in Chernobyl: The Untold Story of the World's Greatest Nuclear Disaster (2019) by Adam Higginbotham is a history of the Chernobyl nuclear disaster that occurred in Soviet Ukraine in 1986. It won the Andrew Carnegie Medal for Excellence in Nonfiction in 2020. Higginbotham spent more than a decade interviewing eyewitnesses and reviewing documents from the disaster including some that were recently declassified. Higginbotham considers it the first English-language account that is close to the truth.

Awards and honors
2019 The New York Times Ten Best Books
2020 Andrew Carnegie Medal for Excellence in Nonfiction
2020 Colby Award

References

2019 non-fiction books
Books about the Chernobyl disaster
Books about the history of science
History books about the Soviet Union
Simon & Schuster books